Pascale Besson (born 24 January 1960) is a former synchronized swimmer from France.

References 

1960 births
Living people
French synchronized swimmers
Olympic synchronized swimmers of France
Synchronized swimmers at the 1984 Summer Olympics